Who's Guilty? is a 1945 American film serial.  It was the 28th of 57 serials released by Columbia Pictures.  Who's Guilty? was a rare attempt at a whodunit mystery film in serial form. The serial's villain (The Voice) was designed to look like The Shadow on the poster. The film co-starred some well-known actors, such as Charles Middleton, Wheeler Oakman and Minerva Urecal. Robert Kent played the lead role of Detective Bob Stewart.

Plot
Walter Calvert (Clark) calls upon his brother Henry at his eerie old house and demands a share of the family fortune, threatening to kill Henry if he doesn't get it. Within days, Henry's car goes over a cliff. Bob Stewart (Kent), a detective Henry asked to investigate the matter if he should die, begins his investigation and Duke Ellis, a newspaper reporter friend, is with him. Bob meets the family at its mansion and questions Henry's sister, his half-brother, his nephew and his nephew's bride, along with Ruth Allen (Ward), whose father was in business with Henry. Henry's brother Patton (Middleton) and a shadowy figure known as The Voice plan to kill all the relatives and divide the fortune. As the murder attempts multiply, Bob, Ruth and Duke endeavor to track down the masterminds and bring them to justice.

Cast
Robert Kent as Bob Stewart, detective
Amelita Ward as Ruth Allen, love interest
Tim Ryan as Duke Ellis
Jayne Hazard as Rita Royale
Minerva Urecal as Mrs Dill, the housekeeper
Charles B. Middleton as Patton, the Butler/Walter Calvert
Davison Clark as Henry Calvert, the murder victim
Sam Flint as Horace Black, the victim's lawyer
Bruce Donovan as Curt Bennett
Jack Ingram as Sergeant Smith
Milton Kibbee as Morgan Calvert
Nacho Galindo as Pancho
Robert Tafur as Jose
Wheeler Oakman as Smiley
Charles King as Burke

Reception
In the opinion of Cline, Robert Kent, as Police Investigator Bob Stewart was the only sane characterisation.  The serial was a "complicated melange of victims and suspects...[Other characters] seemed lost in a swirl of plots, counterplots and cross plots that none of them could understand."

Chapter titles
 Avenging Visitor
 The Unknown Strikes
 Held For Murder
 A Killer at Bay
 Human Bait
 The Plunge of Doom
 A Date with Fate
 Invisible Hands
 Fate's Vengeance
 The Unknown Killer
 Riding to Oblivion
 The Tank of Terror
 White Terror
 A Cry in the Night
 The Guilty One
Source:

See also
List of film serials by year
List of film serials by studio

References

External links
 
 

1945 films
American black-and-white films
Columbia Pictures film serials
1940s English-language films
American mystery films
Films directed by Howard Bretherton
1945 mystery films
Films with screenplays by George H. Plympton
1940s American films